Siobhan Fleming (born 2 October 1981) is an Irish rugby union player. She was a member of the Irish squad at the 2014 Women's Rugby World Cup. She first played rugby union for Tralee RFC in 2007. She was in 's Grand Slam team that won the 2013 Women's Six Nations Championship.

Fleming is a Special Needs Assistant.

References

1981 births
Living people
Irish female rugby union players
Ireland women's international rugby union players
Munster Rugby women's players